This is a list of protected areas of Kazakhstan.

National parks

Nature reserves
Aksu-Djabagly Nature Reserve
Alakol Nature Reserve
Almaty Nature Reserve
Barsa-Kelmes Nature Reserve
Karatau Nature Reserve
Korgalzhyn Nature Reserve
Markakol Nature Reserve
Naurzum Nature Reserve
Ustyurt Nature Reserve
West Altai Nature Reserve

Kazakhstan
Protected areas
Protected areas